"Lalalalalalalalalala" is a song by Czech singer Mikolas Josef, released as a digital single on 9 October 2020 by Vivienne Records. The song was written by Josef, who also co-produced the song with Cristiano Cesario and Marco Quisisana.

Background
Writing on his Instagram account, Josef thanked his fans for their ongoing support over the past year, a period during which he took a leave of absence from his record label and had to cope with anxiety enroute to rebuilding himself, he said, "Tonight is not only about releasing a new single & merch. Tonight I step over the shadows I believed will be the end of me. We all got our demons and reasons to feel beaten down and I sincerely pray everyone emerges victorious from their struggles. Today that is my only wish. This one is for the fighters. Let the song be a reminder to everyone that when you take arms against the sea of troubles you already won. Thank you for your patience. And to all those who made me what I am now."

Music video
A music video to accompany the release of "Lalalalalalalalalala" was released onto YouTube on 19 October 2020.

Track listing

Personnel
Credits adapted from Tidal. 
 Cristiano Cesario – Producer, composer
 Marco Quisisana – Producer, composer
 Mikolas Josef – Producer, composer, writer

Charts

Release history

References

2020 singles
2020 songs
Mikolas Josef songs